The 2022 Rafa Nadal Open was a professional tennis tournament played on hard courts. It was the fourth edition of the tournament which was part of the 2022 ATP Challenger Tour. It took place in Manacor, Spain between 29 August and 4 September 2022.

Singles main-draw entrants

Seeds

 1 Rankings are as of 22 August 2022.

Other entrants
The following players received wildcards into the singles main draw:
  Jerzy Janowicz
  Daniel Rincón
  Abedallah Shelbayh

The following player received entry into the singles main draw using a protected ranking:
  Sebastian Ofner

The following players received entry into the singles main draw as alternates:
  Nicolás Álvarez Varona
  Altuğ Çelikbilek
  Mikhail Kukushkin
  Hamad Međedović
  Leandro Riedi
  Kacper Żuk

The following players received entry from the qualifying draw:
  Marek Gengel
  Daniil Glinka
  Alexandar Lazarov
  Adrián Menéndez Maceiras
  Albano Olivetti
  Daniel Vallejo

Champions

Singles

  Luca Nardi def.  Zizou Bergs 7–6(7–2), 3–6, 7–5.

Doubles

  Yuki Bhambri /  Saketh Myneni def.  Marek Gengel /  Lukáš Rosol 6–2, 6–2.

References

2022 ATP Challenger Tour
2022 in Spanish sport
August 2022 sports events in Spain
September 2022 sports events in Spain